El Hawamdeya is a city in the Giza Governorate of Egypt.

Successive census results indicate a considerable steady rise in its population - 73,298 in 1986,  91,732 in 1996,  109,468 in and 113,128 (estimated) in 2008.

Geography
El Hawamdeya lies in the south of the Giza Governorate and overlooks the Nile river.

Climate
Köppen-Geiger climate classification system classifies its climate as hot desert (BWh).

Education
There are several schools in the city:
Omar Ibn El Khatab language school
El Hawamdeya Primary School
Bebars Primary School
Bebars Preparatory School
Arab El Saha School
El Hawamdeya Preparatory School
Mona El Amir Primary School
El Hawamdeya Secondary School
Zikry Idris Primary School
El Sheikh Etman Primary School
Al Azhary Religious Institute (boys)
Al Azhary Religious Institute (girls)

Religion

Islam
The city houses several mosques, including:
Mohammed Ahmed Abd El Salam Mosque (El Gomhoriah St.)
Ashab El Yameen Mosque (Saad Zagloul St.)
Al-Tawhid Mosque

Christianity
The city contains one of the oldest churches in Egypt; Church of Prince Tadros El Shabaty.

Clubs
El Saha El Shabeya
Sherket El Sokar
Om Khanan
El Sheikh Othman
Markaz Shabab Mona El Amir

Notable people
Thabet El-Batal, an Egyptian international goalkeeper.

References

Populated places in Giza Governorate